The Dallas Sidekicks were one of the longest operating professional soccer teams, either indoor or outdoor, in the United States, based in Dallas, Texas, and operating from 1984 until suspending operations following the 2003-04 season. The team was founded as a member of the original Major Indoor Soccer League. Over the years, the team played in four other leagues (CISL, WISL, PSA, and the second incarnation of the MISL). The team's most famous player was Tatu, who was known for throwing his shirt into the stands after every goal. The team hosted the 1989 MISL All-Star Game. The team was one of the most successful franchises in indoor soccer history, making the playoffs in 16 of their 19 seasons of play. In the playoffs, the team made it to the championship game/series eight times, winning four titles.

An expansion team named after this team began play in the Professional Arena Soccer League on November 3, 2012. Home games for the new Dallas Sidekicks are played at the Allen Event Center in Allen, Texas.

Honors 

Championships (4)
 1986–87 MISL
 1993 CISL
 1998 PSA
 2001 WISL

Division Titles (5)
 1989–90 MISL Western Division
 1993 CISL Regular Season
 1994 CISL Eastern Division
 1998 PSA Regular Season
 2003–04 MISL II Western Division

Key moments 
The first goal (and first powerplay goal) in team history was scored by forward Herve Guilliod on November 2, 1984, in a game against the Las Vegas Americans. Goals #100, #2,000, and #3,000 were all scored by all-time team scoring leader Tatu.

Around noon on Feb. 13, 1989 The Dallas Sidekicks filed for Chapter 11 bankruptcy protection, one hour before the Mavericks were scheduled to file suit seeking to force the Sidekicks to repay a $519,000 debt. Team president David Shuttee said the debt was from 1986, when a group of Dallas businessmen purchased the Sidekicks from Mavericks owner Donald Carter.

Rivalry 
During the MISL I days, the Sidekicks main rivals were the San Diego Sockers, Tacoma Stars, and Minnesota Strikers. During the 1990s, a rivalry developed between the Sidekicks and Monterrey La Raza.

Head coaches 
In March 2013, Gordon Jago was named to the 2013 class of the Indoor Soccer Hall of Fame.

Retired uniform numbers 
 #5 Mike Powers 1987–2001
 #8 Wes McLeod 1986–1992
 #9 Tatu 1984–2003
 #10 Kevin Smith 1984–92, 1995–98
 #11 David Doyle 1991–2004
 #22 Doc Lawson 1985–91
 #23 Nick Stavrou 1991-04
 #31 Krys Sobieski 1985–91
 Gordon Jago Head Coach/General Manager 1984–98

Former players 
 #00 Shawn Ray 1994–95, 1996–98
 #4 Rusty Troy 1995–2004
 #5 Mike Powers 1987–2001
 #8 Wes McLeod 1986–1992
 #9 Tatu 1984–2003
 #10 Kevin Smith 1984–92, 1995–98
 #11 David Doyle 1991–2004
 #18 Nick Efthimiou 1993-1999
 #22 Doc Lawson 1985–91
 #31 Krys Sobieski 1985–91

Arenas 
 Reunion Arena, 1984–2004
 American Airlines Center, 2001 (one game)
 Inwood Soccer Center, 1986-04 (Practice facility & Exhibition games)

Year-by-year 

 *There were 7 seasons where the league the Sidekicks were competing in did not feature divisions, so there was a regular season league champion before the playoffs began.
 **This 1986–87 Sidekicks team was inducted into the Pizza Hut Park Texans Credit Union Walk of Fame. Known forever in Dallas as the "Never Say Die" season, the Dallas Sidekicks defeated a heavily favored Tacoma Stars squad to win the 1987 MISL Championship. Down three games to two in a best-of-seven series, the Sidekicks won the final two games 5–4 and 4–3 respectively, both in overtime and both in front of sold-out arenas in Tacoma and Dallas.

References

External links 
Team History
Pizza Hut Park Walk of Fame

 
Sidekicks 1984
Association football clubs established in 1984
Association football clubs disestablished in 2004
Defunct indoor soccer clubs in the United States
Major Indoor Soccer League (1978–1992) teams
Continental Indoor Soccer League teams
World Indoor Soccer League teams
Major Indoor Soccer League (2001–2008) teams
Soccer clubs in Texas
1984 establishments in Texas
2004 disestablishments in Texas
Companies that filed for Chapter 11 bankruptcy in 1989